
Gmina Reńska Wieś, German Gemeinde Reinschdorf is a rural gmina (administrative district) in Kędzierzyn-Koźle County, Opole Voivodeship, in south-western Poland.

Since 2006 the commune, like much of the area, has been bilingual in German and Polish, a substantial German minority having remained behind after the area was transferred to Polish control.

Villages
The commune contains the villages and settlements of:

Reńska Wieś
Bytków
Dębowa
Długomiłowice
Gierałtowice
Kamionka
Komorno
Łężce
Mechnica
Naczysławki
Poborszów
Pociękarb
Pokrzywnica
Radziejów
Większyce

Neighbouring gminas
Gmina Reńska Wieś is bordered by the gminas of Głogówek, Walce and Zdzieszowice.

Twin towns – sister cities

Gmina Reńska Wieś is twinned with:

 Andělská Hora, Czech Republic
 Biała Piska, Poland
 Horka, Germany
 Neuenstein, Germany
 Nógrád, Hungary
 Szendehely, Hungary
 Tarnivtsi, Ukraine

References

Renska Wies
Kędzierzyn-Koźle County
Bilingual communes in Poland